The Grand Ducal Police is the national police force of the Grand Duchy of Luxembourg. The police is under the control of the Minister for the Interior of Luxembourg, although they operate in the name, and under the ultimate control, of the Grand Duke of Luxembourg. Day-to-day executive control is exercised by the Director-General of the Grand Ducal Police. The Grand Ducal Police has existed in its current form since 1 January 2000, when the Grand Ducal Gendarmerie was merged with the police service.

The Grand Ducal Police is responsible for ensuring the Grand Duchy of Luxembourg's internal security, maintaining law and order, border control and enforcing all laws and Grand Ducal decrees.  It is also responsible for assisting the Military of Luxembourg in its internal operations, as prescribed by the Grand Duke of Luxembourg.

Organization
The Grand Ducal Police's operations are divided into six regions, which are under the command of a regional director. The director is responsible for primary intervention centres, secondary intervention centres, local police stations, and region-wide services.  The region headquarters are in Capellen, Diekirch, Esch-sur-Alzette, Grevenmacher, Luxembourg City, and Mersch.

The primary intervention centres (abbreviated 'CIP') are the most capable and best equipped police stations to address emergencies. The CIPs also serve as the headquarters for the region, providing administrative support for the region's other operation centres. The CIPs' jurisdictions cover their respective regions (illustrated in different colours on the map, right).

Under the six CIPs are thirteen 'secondary intervention centre' (abbreviated 'CIS').  As the CIPs perform the role of the CISs, as well as their own functions, there are seven dedicated CISs, located in Differdange, Dudelange, Echternach, Redange, Remich, Troisvierges, and Wiltz.

Local police stations (abbreviated 'CP') operate separately from the CISs and CIPs, but are under the control of the regional director. In addition to the thirteen CIPs and CISs, which perform the role of CPs, there are thirty-eight dedicated local stations, distributed across the main towns and cities of Luxembourg. Eight of these dedicated CPs are in Luxembourg City, in addition to the CIP.

A special police division at Luxembourg – Findel Airport is directly responsible for border control.

The regional police forces are also directly responsible for policing the roads, criminal investigation, and providing aid to victims of crime.

Officers are armed with the Heckler & Koch VP9 (SFP9 model in use) chambered in 9×19mm

Important: On 22 June 2015, the government of Luxembourg announced a complete overhaul of that organization structure. As a consequence, this chapter has to be revised, once the new structure will be in place.

Director-General
The head of the Grand Ducal Police is the Director-General. There have been four Directors-General since the creation of the Grand Ducal Police in 2000.

Emergencies
It is either the CISs or the CIPs that one would contact in the event of an emergency, as they are the only police stations which are continuously open. The emergency telephone number for the police is 113, instead of 112, like the other emergency services.

Footnotes

External links

 Grand Ducal Police official website
 Musée International d'Effets de Gendarmerie et Police Luxembourg website

Law enforcement agencies of Luxembourg
National Central Bureaus of Interpol
2000 establishments in Luxembourg
Government agencies established in 2000